The Southern Sydney Sharks is a Rugby league team that competed in the 2008 Jim Beam Cup competition, this was their only season in the competition to date, with the team renaming themselves as the Southern Districts Rebels before folding the following season. The Sharks home ground was Sutherland Oval.

In the Sharks first and only season, they managed to win six matches, their best performance being a 41-12 win over Chester Hill Rhinos, their leading try scorer was Sharlon Taki with 18, Mitch Mahon was the leading point scorer with 9, they were coached by former NRL player Luke Goodwin.

See also

Rugby league in New South Wales

References

External links

Rugby league teams in New South Wales
Rugby league teams in Sydney
Rugby clubs established in 1953
1953 establishments in Australia